Scott Otten (born 19 July 1994) is a Welsh former rugby union player who played for Ospreys as a hooker. He also played for the Wales under-20 international side.

Otten made his debut for the Ospreys in 2013 having previously played for the Ospreys academy, Aberavon RFC, Neath RFC, Swansea RFC and Waunarlwydd RFC. 

In May 2021, based on medical advice, he retired from professional rugby after a neck injury back in January of the same year.

References

External links 
Ospreys Player Profile
itsrugby.co.uk Profile

Rugby union players from Swansea
Welsh rugby union players
Ospreys (rugby union) players
Living people
1994 births
Rugby union hookers